The 2012 Alaska general elections were held on November 6, 2012. Primary elections were held on August 28, 2012.

U.S. House of Representatives

Republican incumbent Don Young, who has represented Alaska's at-large congressional district since 1973, was running for re-election. He defeated John Cox, a retired Navy officer who also ran for the seat in 2010, and Terre Gales, an asset manager and Air Force veteran, in the Republican primary.

State Representative Sharon Cissna sought and received the Democratic nomination to challenge Young. She defeated Debra Chesnut, a nurse and businesswoman; Matt Moore, a businessman; Doug Urquidi, a construction worker and Army veteran; and, Frank Vondersaar, a lawyer and perennial candidate, in the Democratic primary.

Jim McDermott, a business professor, ran as the Libertarian nominee. Ted Gianoutsos was running as an Independent, while Clinton Desjarlais, Fletcher Fuller Jr., and Sidney Hill were running as write-ins.

State Legislature

Senate
Because of redistricting, 19 out of the 20 members of the Alaska Senate were up for election. The state Senate was evenly split between 10 Democrats and 10 Republicans, but consists of a bipartisan coalition majority made up of all 10 Democrats and 6 Republicans, with the remaining 4 Republicans making up the minority.
Open seats
District C: This was a new seat, with no current incumbent.

District D (old District G): Republican incumbent and Coalition member Linda Menard was defeated in the primary.

District H: This was a new seat, with no current incumbent.

District O (old District Q): Republican incumbent and Coalition member Thomas Wagoner was defeated in the primary.

House of Representatives
All 40 members of the Alaska House of Representatives were up for election. The state House currently consists of 24 Republicans and 16 Democrats, of which 22 Republicans and 4 Democrats make up the majority caucus.

Open seats

District 1: This was a new seat, with no current incumbent.

District 5: This was a new seat, with no current incumbent.

District 9: This was a new seat, with no current incumbent.

District 13: This was a new seat, with no current incumbent.

District 15 (old District 24): Democratic incumbent Berta Gardner was running for the District H state Senate seat.

District 16 (old District 25): Democratic incumbent Mike Doogan  was retiring.

District 17 (old District 22): Democratic incumbent Sharon Cissna was running for the at-large congressional seat.

District 26 (old District 17): Republican incumbent Anna Fairclough was running for the District M state Senate seat.

District 40: Democratic incumbent Reggie Joule was retiring, running for mayor of Northwest Arctic Borough.

References

External links

 Alaska at Ballotpedia
 Alaska judicial elections, 2012 at Judgepedia
 Alaska 2012 campaign finance data from OpenSecrets
 Alaska Congressional Races in 2012 campaign finance data from OpenSecrets
 Outside spending at the Sunlight Foundation